Park Tae-sik (born 8 January 1952) is a South Korean boxer. He competed at the 1972 Summer Olympics and the 1976 Summer Olympics. At the 1976 Summer Olympics, he lost to Vladimir Kolev of Bulgaria.

References

1952 births
Living people
South Korean male boxers
Olympic boxers of South Korea
Boxers at the 1972 Summer Olympics
Boxers at the 1976 Summer Olympics
Place of birth missing (living people)
Asian Games medalists in boxing
Boxers at the 1974 Asian Games
Asian Games silver medalists for South Korea
Medalists at the 1974 Asian Games
Light-welterweight boxers